Malgudi Days is an Indian television series that started in 1986, and was filmed in both English (first 13 episodes) and Hindi (all 54 episodes), based on the 1943 short story collection of the same name by R. K. Narayan. The series was directed by Kannada actor and director Shankar Nag. Carnatic musician L. Vaidyanathan composed the score, while R. K. Narayan's younger brother and acclaimed cartoonist R. K. Laxman was the sketch artist. The series was made by film producer T.S. Narasimhan. In 2006, the series was revived for an additional 15 episodes, which were directed by Kavitha Lankesh.

Plot
The series is adapted from the collections of short stories written by R. K. Narayan in his books Malgudi Days, A Horse and Two Goats, An Astrologer's Day and Other Short Stories, as well as the novels Swami and Friends, and The Vendor of Sweets.

Episodes
Season - 1 (1986 - 13 Episodes)
 A Hero / Hero
 A Horse and 2 Goats / Muni
 The Missing Mail / Dhakia
 The Hoard / Maha Kanjus
 Cat Within / Paap ka Gada
 Leela’s Friend / Sidda
 Old Man of the Temple / Mandir ka Budda
 The Watchman / Chowkidar
 A Willing Slave / Aaya
 Roman Image / Rome ka Murthi
 Sweets for Angels / Kaali
 The Seventh House / Saathvan Ghar
 Nitya

Season - 2 (1987 - 13 Episodes)
 Engine Trouble / Engine ki Kahani
 Iswaran
 The Gateman’s Gift / Govind Singh ki Bhent
 The Edge / Dhara
 Forty-Five a Month / 45 Rupiya
 Swamy and Friends / Swami – 1
 Swamy and Friends / Swami – 2
 Swamy and Friends / Swami – 3
 Swamy and Friends / Swami – 4
 Swamy and Friends / Swami – 5
 Swamy and Friends / Swami – 6
 Swamy and Friends / Swami – 7
 Swamy and Friends / Swami – 8

Season - 3 (1988 - 13 Episodes)
 Performing Child / Abhinetri
 The Career / Ramji ki Leela
 Trail of the Green Blazer / Pocket Maar
 Naga – 1
 Naga – 2
 Vendor of Sweets / Mithaiwala – 1
 Vendor of Sweets / Mithaiwala – 2
 Vendor of Sweets / Mithaiwala – 3
 Vendor of Sweets / Mithaiwala – 4
 Vendor of Sweets / Mithaiwala – 5
 Vendor of Sweets / Mithaiwala – 6
 Vendor of Sweets / Mithaiwala – 7
 Vendor of Sweets / Mithaiwala – 8

Season - 4 (2006 - 15 Episodes)
 Annamalai – 1
 Annamalai – 2
 The Gold Belt / Sone ka Kamarband
 Dodu
 Doctor's Word
 Four Rupees
 Neighbour's Help
 Minister Without Portfolio & Korean Grass
 Salt & Saw Dust – 1
 Salt & Saw Dust – 2
 Lawley Road – 1
 Lawley Road – 2
 The Antidote
 The Snake Song
 An Astrologer's Day

Cast
 Master Manjunath as W. S. Swaminathan "Swami" 
 Girish Karnad as W. T. Srinivasan 
 Vaishali Kasaravalli as Swami's mother 
 Suhasini Adarkar as Swami's grandmother 
 Kanti Madiya as Muniya "Muni" 
 B. Jayashree as Muniya's wife 
 Somu as Shopkeeper
 Teddy White as Frank
 Deven Bhojani as Nitya 
 Harish Patel as Various characters
 Anant Nag as Various characters
 Vishnuvardhan as Venkat Rao
 Shankar Nag as Venkatesh 
 Ramesh Bhat as various characters
 Rohit Srinath as Rajam 
 Raghuram Sitaram as Mani 
 Chetan as S. Somashekar "Somu" 
 Arundathi Nag as Kamala 
 Sunil Sadanand as Mali, Jagan's son 
 Mandeep Rai as Narsimha, Jagan's cousin 
 Ashok Mandanna as Thanappa 
 Vasanth Josalkar as Govind Singh
 Kalpana Naganath as various characters
 Dina Pathak as Ayah 
 Jagadish Malnad as Sidda 
 Mico Chandru as Swamy's father 
 Sampath Raj as Ekambaram
 S. K. Padmadevi as Elderly villager
 Siddaraj Kalyankar (The Gold Belt) Main cast

Background and production

The series Malgudi Days, comprising thirty nine episodes, was first telecast on Doordarshan in 1986. Most of the series was shot in Agumbe village in Shimoga district, Karnataka. Some episodes were filmed in Bengaluru and some others in Devarayanadurga located in Tumakuru district in Karnataka. One episode, "Nitya", was shot entirely in Devarayanadurga.

In 2004, the project was revived with filmmaker Kavitha Lankesh replacing Shankar Nag as director. The new series was telecast from 26 April 2006 on Doordarshan.  Most of the stories in the series are one episode long and were derived from the books A Horse and Two Goats, Malgudi Days, Swami and Friends and The Vendor of Sweets.

Legacy 
Indian Railways decided to rename Arasalu Railway station of Shivamogga District, Karnataka, India to Malgudi Railway station as homage to the location of Malgudi Days serial.

References

External links

DD National original programming
Indian drama television series
Adaptations of works by R. K. Narayan
Indian period television series
1980s Indian television series
1987 Indian television series debuts
1988 Indian television series endings
2006 Indian television series debuts
2006 Indian television series endings
Television shows based on Indian novels
Television shows set in the British Raj
Television series revived after cancellation
Indian anthology television series